Schroedter or Schrödter is a German-language surname. Notable people with the surname include:

Adolf Schrödter (1805–1875), German painter and illustrator
Erich Schroedter  (1919–1994), German World War II soldier
Elisabeth Schroedter (born 1959), German politician
Fabian Schrödter (born 1982), German water polo player
Franz Schroedter (1897–1968), German art director

German-language surnames